Glanyrafon Halt railway station was a station on the Tanat Valley Light Railway, located a mile west of Llanyblodwel, Shropshire, England on the south side of the River Tanat. The station opened in 1904 and closed in 1951. It was located on the east side of an occupation crossing and could be accessed by a footbridge across the river from the hamlet of Glan-yr-afon.

References

Further reading

Disused railway stations in Shropshire
Railway stations in Great Britain opened in 1904
Railway stations in Great Britain closed in 1951
Former Cambrian Railway stations